The COVID-19 pandemic in Hungary is part of the ongoing worldwide pandemic of coronavirus disease 2019 caused by severe acute respiratory syndrome coronavirus 2. On 4 March 2020, the first cases in Hungary were announced. The first coronavirus-related death was announced on 15 March on the government's official website.

On March 18, 2020, Surgeon general Cecília Müller announced that the virus had spread to every part of the country. As of June 2021, Hungary has the second-highest COVID-19 death rate in the world.

Background 
The Hungarian Operational Task Force was formed on January 31, 2020, led by Sándor Pintér, Interior Minister and Miklós Kásler, Minister of Human Resources, and included:
 Surgeon General Cecília Müller,
 Károly Papp, Director of Security Department of Interior Ministry,
 János Balogh, Chief of National Police, and the directors of National High Directorate of Disaster Management, Anti-Terrorism Center, Central Hospital of South Pest, National Healthcare Supplying Service and National Ambulance.
 Zoltán Jenei, Director of the National Healthcare Service Center
Staff has immediately announced its plan for security against the spread of virus. After detecting the virus in the country, they announced that operational staff would hold daily meetings at noon.

On  February 1, the spokesperson of National Command of Penalty Execution (BVOP) announced that prisoners of Debrecen and Sátoraljaújhely had started the production of sanitary masks. They produce 20 000 masks daily in a 12-hour shift, which are stored in different repositories all around the country, and continually delivered to general practitioners.

At the beginning of the pandemic, the virus was concentrated in and around Wuhan. Seven Hungarians living in Wuhan, who wanted to move back to Europe, were transported through France and placed in quarantine for two weeks. They remained healthy during those two weeks and were released on 16 February.

Due to the events and news connected to the outbreak of the novel coronavirus, in February 2020, several goods—such as antiseptic arm cleaning materials, masks and non-perishable food – were in short supply in a lot of shops in Hungary. Tamás Schanda, strategical and political under-secretary of Innovation and the Science Ministry said "The Government understands the concerns of the people, but experts say it is unnecessary and pointless to hoard non-perishable food." The accumulation of goods declined quite quickly, and the detection of the virus in March did not cause measurable problems in shops.

The Government of Hungary launched its official webpage and official Facebook page about the novel coronavirus, both on 4 March 2020.

Timeline 

The first two known cases were students from Iran, who were studying in Hungary. One of them was enrolled at the Pharmacy Faculty of Semmelweis University. The student did not comply with the preventive measures required by the university as a precaution. He already visited his primary care physician and he was diagnosed with bacterial infection so that he didn't have to quarantine himself, and instead, he attended courses held in English with 16 other students. The other person studied at the Hungarian University of Agriculture and Life Sciences in Gödöllő, who after returning from Iran, went to a self-declared quarantine. He did not attend lectures at the university, but went to Saint Ladislaus Hospital, and declared that he had arrived from an infected territory.

Both of them were transported to Saint Ladislaus Hospital. They had mild symptoms. They arrived back in Hungary on 26 and 28 February 2020.

A third infection was announced on 5 March 2020. He was a 69-year-old British man who was working in Milan and travelled frequently between Milan and Debrecen. He developed a fever, so he visited his doctor. He was diagnosed and transported to Gyula Kenézy Hospital. Shortly after, the fourth infected had been announced. She was a girlfriend of one of the Iranian students that were first diagnosed. She was proactively isolated when the virus was diagnosed in the Iranians.

The fifth infected was identified on 7 March 2020, a 70-year-old man, who may have been infected by his son. The son previously visited some other countries, such as Italy.

The sixth and seventh infected persons were announced on 8 March 2020. They were exposed to the earlier diagnosed five infected persons. One of them was a friend of one of the Iranian students who was participating in a birthday party. The other was the Hungarian wife of the British man in Debrecen. The next day, two other people were found to be infected, and, like the previous day, one of the infected had also come in contact with the first infected Iranian student. The other one was the wife of the elder man who has been isolated. On 10 March 2020, three new cases were discovered with students related to the first infected Iranian student, so they had remained under quarantine. A day later, a Hungarian woman was announced as the 13th infected. She had come into contact with the first person isolated in Debrecen. Due to this she was hospitalised for several days.

The first death which may have been due to the coronavirus occurred on 11 March 2020. A 99-year-old woman was in hospital, where she was operated on at Saint Imre Hospital. After the successful operation, she had fever and pneumonia. Her daughter – who visited her regularly – got pneumonia the same day. Later, the daughter was diagnosed with COVID-19. Her mother was never tested and so not registered in connection with coronavirus.

Three new cases were reported on 12 March 2020. One was a student from Iran (a contact of the first case) whilst the other two were Hungarian citizens. One of the two Hungarians was a woman who had been in Saint Ladislaus Hospital for several days, the other one was a man travelling from Israel. On 12 March 2020, János Szlávik, head of Infectological Department of South Pest Center Hospital, confirmed that an Iranian citizen, held in quarantine, had recovered. All of his test results were negative.

On 13 March 2020, the number of known cases increased by 3, all of whom were Hungarian citizens. One of them, a 67-year-old man, had met several people from abroad in connection with his work. One other was a 41-year-old man, who had recently been in the Netherlands and England. The third one was a 27-year-old man, who had travelled to Israel with one of the already known infected people.

On 14 March 2020, 11 new people were diagnosed with COVID-19, bringing the total to 30; 6 were announced in the morning and 5 in the evening. All of the new cases were Hungarian citizens. The newly diagnosed patients include people who had been to Italy, and a person whose family member had returned from Austria.

On 15 March 2020, 2 more people had been diagnosed with COVID-19, for a total of 32. Both of these cases were Hungarian citizens.

On the same day, Sándor Szaniszló, the Mayor of Pestszentlőrinc-Pestszentimre announced the death of a patient at St Ladislaus Hospital who had been diagnosed with coronavirus. He is the first official death of the pandemic in Hungary. He was a 75 years-old man who had died due to infection with SARS-CoV-2 coronavirus and the COVID-19 sickness.

A second recovered patient had left the hospital on 16 March 2020, who was from Iran.

On 18 March 2020, 47 out of the 58 confirmed infected people were Hungarian, 9 Iranian, 1 British, and 1 Kazakh citizen.

On 19 March 2020, there were 9 Iranian, 1 British, 1 Kazakh, and 62 Hungarian infected; all together there were 73 cases. Six were in critical condition, and were in the Intensive Department of South Pest Center Hospital.

On 20 March 2020, there were 85 confirmed infected people: 10 Iranian, 1 British, 1 Kazakh, and 73 Hungarian citizens. Six of them were in critical condition, whilst 7 had recovered. On this day, three men, a 79, a 68 and a 53-year-old, had died of the 85 infected; the latter had multiple chronic diseases as well.

On 21 March 2020, the number of confirmed cases was 103: 10 Iranian, 2 British, 1 Kazakh, 1 Vietnamese, and 89 Hungarian citizens.

On 22 March 2020, the number of confirmed cases was 131: 10 Iranian, 2 British, 1 Kazakh, 1 Vietnamese, and 117 Hungarian citizens.

The number of infections reported from 26 November 2020 contains cases identified by quick tests conducted in mobile testing stations, ambulances, and among healthcare workers as well. The number of newly tested samples for 26 November contains both PCR tests and quick tests.

Graph charts

Infections by county

Vaccination

Government response 

On 7 March 2020, national ceremonies marking the anniversary of the Hungarian Revolution on 15 March 2020 were cancelled. Other cities and towns made similar decisions. A job fair planned to be held between 18 and 19 March at the University of Technology and Economics was also postponed.

The frequency of disinfection on Budapest public transport vehicles has increased, and the rule about using only the first door for boarding has been suspended, to decrease crowding. On 13 March 2020, similar rules regarding getting on public transport were introduced in Miskolc as well.

The National Ambulance Service has provided more ambulances across the country to make easier the handling of increasing patients. 145 beds were freed for this cause in Saint Ladislaus Hospital, belonging to South Pest Central Hospital. Their capacity is now 81 rooms with 189 beds. If these fill up, other hospitals, capable of handling this type of situation, will also be used for quarantine locations elsewhere in the country. Since 8 March visiting someone in a hospital or in any social institution which provides long-term stay has been prohibited. Budapest Zoo and Botanical Garden as well as every thermal bath will remain closed from 16 March. Starting with the same day, BuBi may be used for 100 HUF.

On 17 March, the Surgeon General announced that the National Safety Laboratory of National Health Security Center had successfully isolated COVID-19 from a Hungarian patient's sample, which it could use for researching vaccines from a Hungarian patient's sample, to be used for the researches and production of new vaccine in Hungary. A consortium founded by Immunology Department at Faculty of Sciences of Eötvös Loránd University, Biological Institute at Science Faculty of University of Pécs, Richter Gedeon and ImmunoGenes is involved in international biotechnological developments. Imre Kacskovics, leader of Immunology Department of ELTE said, product currently under preparation at the first phase it won't be a vaccine, it provides only passive immunity, but it won't be able to prepare the body to fight against virus. Some days after the successful isolation Bioinformatic Research Team of Szentágothay János Research Center at University of Pécs and the virologist experts of the university found the genome of new SARS-CoV-2 human coronavirus available in Hungary.

On 19 March, Andrea Mager Minister without portfolio, responsible for National Wealth and the team led by her prepared and accepted recommendations which were the basis of economic decisions published next day.

During the fall months, the cases started to hit record numbers almost every week. Until the end of October, Orbán was against a lockdown which the country saw during the first wave. However, the course changed rapidly in November. The government implemented a curfew from midnight to 5 a.m., reintroduced the state of emergency, closed entertainment venues, further limited public events and tightened mask wearing rules. On 14 November, the country went into a new partial lockdown for 30 days. The curfew was extended to 8 p.m., gatherings were limited, stores and hairdressers had to close by 7 p.m., restaurants were only allowed to offer meals to go, hotels were not allowed to receive tourist guests, events and amateur team sport were banned, recreational facilities and institutions such as gyms, swimming pools, theatres, museums, and zoos were closed. Students above the 9th grade, university, and college students had to switch to online teaching. Kindergarten and school teachers had to be tested weekly. A few days later it became mandatory to wear a face mask in all public spaces, except for green spaces, in large cities.

On 21 May 2021, Orban informed that the nation was going to lift the most remaining COVID-19 restrictions, including a night-time curfew, as soon as the number of those vaccinated reaches 5 million. He also added that masks would no longer need to be worn in public, and gatherings of up to 500 people could be held in the open air. Events in closed spaces will be open to those with vaccination cards. "This means we have defeated the third wave of the pandemic," Orban was quoted as saying.

State of emergency
On 11 March 2020, the Hungarian government declared a state of emergency. While these periods usually last for 15 days (after which the state of emergency must be renewed by Parliament), Minister of the Prime Minister's Office Gergely Gulyás said the measures may be in force indefinitely, as "there is a consensus that the length of this period may be not only weeks, but months." Public gatherings in an enclosed space with more than 100 people were prohibited, sporting events that could attract more than 500 spectators must be held behind closed doors, and foreign exchange programs were suspended. Universities were ordered to suspend in-person classes and switch to online courses.

Elementary and high schools were initially excluded from closure, due to an initial assessment that COVID-19 did not have as serious of an impact to children. The Ministry of Human Capacities recommended that schools suspend field trips, open-air classes, and exchange programs. On 13 March during a radio interview, Prime Minister Viktor Orbán said kindergarten was also excluded since parents would have to guarantee children's supervision, and teachers would be required to take unpaid leave. That evening, Orbán announced that elementary and high schools would be closed to in-person classes effective 16 March.

On 16 March 2020, Prime Minister Orbán announced further restrictions, including ordering the cancellation of all events, and banning restaurants and cafes from operating beyond 3 pm. Only grocery stores and pharmacies would be allowed to remain open past this time. In addition, it was announced that the country would allow entry to Hungarian citizens only. In spite of the notices issued by operational staff about responsible behaviour and moderation, a 30-year-old security guard shared fake news on YouTube regarding the pandemic. He was the subject of police action.

Rule by decree 
On 30 March 2020, the National Assembly passed an act 137–53 that made the state of emergency indefinite and allowed Prime Minister Orbán to rule by decree during it. During the state of emergency, by-elections and national and local referendums must be postponed until after the conclusion of the state of emergency, and deliberate bodies of a local governments and national minority self-governments cannot be dissolved. The act also makes the deliberate distribution of misleading information that obstructs responses to the pandemic punishable by up to five years in prison, and breaking quarantine punishable by up to three.

The bill faced opposition for containing indefinite restrictions on these powers, as well as concerns over the possibility that the "fake news" prohibition in the bill could be abused for censorship of dissenting opinions towards the government's response. On 31 March 2020, liberal members of European parliament voiced concerns that the bill was incompatible with belonging to the European Union. Without mentioning Hungary, European Commission president Ursula von der Leyen advised that measures for controlling the pandemic should be "limited to what is necessary and strictly proportionate", and "not at the expense of our fundamental principles and values as set out in the treaties".

On 1 April 2020, a joint statement was issued by 13 EU member states, stating that they were "deeply concerned" about emergency initiatives violating democracy, fundamental rights, and the rule of law. The statement did not explicitly refer to Hungary; the country joined the statement the following day. On 30 April 2020, Viktor Orban's chief of staff Gergely Gulyás announced that Hungarian schools will remain closed to the end of May 2020, and events that feature more than 500 participants are banned until 15 August 2020.

The National Assembly abolished the state of emergency on 16 June 2020.

Travel and entry restrictions 
Entry restrictions were initially targeted towards countries with large numbers of cases; the country initially began to suspend admission of migrants from its transit zones on the Serbian border, citing the outbreak in Iran. On 6 March 2020, Hungary suspended the issuance of visas to Iranian citizens. On 9 March 2020, restrictions began to emerge on air traffic from Northern Italy due to the outbreak in the country. On 11 March 2020, pursuant to the state of emergency, Hungary barred entry into the country by foreign nationals via China, Iran, Italy and South Korea. Hungarian citizens would still be allowed to return, but would be required to undergo 14 days of self-isolation upon return. Border checks were also re-implemented at the Austrian and Slovenian borders, and the government suspended travel by its employees without prior approval. On 13 March 2020, Israel was added after some cases were tied to travel to the country.

On 16 March 2020, Hungary restricted entry into the country to citizens only.

From 27 April 2020, wearing a mask will be mandatory on public transport in Budapest.

On 28 August 2020, as cases started to rise again, Gergely Gulyás announced all borders to close as of 1 September 2020. Hungarians returning to Hungary have to provide two negative tests or go into quarantine.

Economic decisions for managing the emergency 

Mihály Varga Minister of Finance said the government had to react to the real needs of the economy, and they were still waiting for the feedback from the trade and industry chamber. On 18 March during the early afternoon hours Viktor Orbán announced several upcoming decisions. Though he used his own Facebook page instead of the dedicated communication channels.
The decisions were as follow:
 All due payments are suspended which are caused by loans to persons and companies. It is valid for capital and interest payment as well. This is in force up to the end of the year.
 Short-term loans for companies are prolonged up to 30 June.
 Loans delivered from 19 March may have a maximum 5% above the Hungarian National Bank's interest rate.
 Government remits subsidiaries which should have to paid based on the number of employees on the fields of tourism, catering, leisure, sport, culture and personal taxi services. Employees working in these sectors do not have to pay a pension subsidiary and the fee for receiving the benefits of the health sector is the minimum fee declared in the act.
 Taxi drivers subject to the KATA tax system are exempt from tax until 30 June.
 Rental contracts which are in connection with the above listed sectors may not be abrogated, rental fees may not be increased.
 Contribution to the development of tourism (a kind of tax) is suspended until 30 June.
 Labor rules will be more flexible, to make agreements between employers and employees easier.

The Order about these changes was published in the 18 March edition of Magyar Közlöny. Mihály Varga Minister of Finance and representatives of Hungarian Banking Association had a meeting regarding actions listed above.

Use of vaccines from China and Russia 
Reports in March 2021 stated that Hungary was the first country in the EU to "begin using China's Sinopharm and Russia's Sputnik V vaccines, even as polling showed that public trust in non-EU approved vaccines was low". The European Commission's Vaccine Passport plan excluded the Sputnik and Sinopharm products because they were not "EU authorized vaccines". One suggestion to resolve that issue was for "Russian and Chinese vaccine producers submit their products to the EMA for testing and authorization". In end March 2021, Hungary also granted emergency use licenses to two more vaccines, CanSino (from China) and Covishield (produced by Serum Institute of India), but as of August 2021, neither of them were used in the national vaccination programme.

With the original orders depleted, Hungary doesn't offer Sputnik vaccines anymore as of August, 2021, however, Sinopharm vaccines are still available for the country's pioneer third dose vaccination programme.

Impact on sport
Nearly all sport events were affected by the state of emergency introduced on 11 March 2020. It banned all indoor events with at least 100 and every outdoor events with at least 500 participants. As a consequence the next 25th round of 2019–20 Nemzeti Bajnokság I had to be played without spectators. Only six out of 55 member states of UEFA had open matches, which were free to visit. On 16 March 2020, there was a decision made about suspension of the championship, suspending all matches.

On 11 March 2020, they ended Erste Liga 2019–2020 Hungarian ice hockey championship, which was at the semi-final stage, and the same decision was made about all other ice hockey championships in the country. All matches part of championships and cup series organised by the Hungarian Handball Association were suspended. The same decision was made by the Hungarian Water Polo Federation. Basketball and volleyball championships were also suspended. The National Swimming Championship has also been prolonged. The Hungarian Boxing Association announced the evacuation of participants from London, where qualification for the 2020 Summer Olympics were ongoing. Hungarian Karate Federation announced that they temporally cancel karate contents part of the content calendar. On 13 March, the three étaps of Giro d'Italia in the country had been cancelled. On 17 March 2020, the most well-known Hungarian bicycle tour, Tour de Hongrie has been moved from May to October 2020.

Due to the state of emergency in Bulgaria, they banned all sport events in the country up to 29 March 2020. As a result, the qualifying match between Bulgaria and Hungary has been postponed. On 17 March 2020, UEFA postponed the whole championship a year to 2021, which is scheduled to be held among other countries apart from Hungary.

European Karate Federation informed Hungarian Karate Federation about the cancelling European Championship that year, planned to take place in Baku from 25 to 29 March 2020. This championship is part of the qualification events to the Olympics.

See also 
 COVID-19 pandemic in Europe
 COVID-19 pandemic by country and territory
 COVID-19 pandemic in Austria
 COVID-19 pandemic in Croatia
 COVID-19 pandemic in Romania
 COVID-19 pandemic in Serbia
 COVID-19 pandemic in Slovakia
 COVID-19 pandemic in Slovenia
 COVID-19 pandemic in Ukraine

References

External links
 Official website – Cabinet Office of the Prime Minister (Hungary)
 
 Wikiversity:COVID-19/All-cause deaths/Hungary

 
Hungary
Hungary
Disease outbreaks in Hungary
2020 in Hungary
2021 in Hungary
2020 disasters in Hungary
2021 disasters in Hungary